François is a French masculine given name and surname, equivalent to the English name Francis.

People with the given name 
 Francis I of France, King of France, known as "the Father and Restorer of Letters"
 Francis II of France, King of France and King consort of Scots, known as the husband of Mary Stuart, Queen of Scots
 François Amoudruz (1926–2020), French resistance fighter
 François-Marie Arouet (better known as Voltaire; 1694–1778), French Enlightenment writer, historian, and philosopher
François Aubry (disambiguation), several people
François Baby (disambiguation), several people
 François Beauchemin (born 1980), Canadian ice hockey player for the Anaheim Duck
François Blanc (1806–1877), French entrepreneur and operator of casinos
François Boucher (disambiguation), several people
François Caron (disambiguation), several people
 François Cevert (1944–1973), French racing driver
 François Chau (born 1959), Cambodian American actor
 François Clemmons (born 1945), American singer and actor
 François Corbier (1944–2018), French television presenter and songwriter
 François Coulomb the Elder (1654–1717), French naval architect
 François Coulomb the Younger (1691–1751), French naval architect
 François Couperin (1668–1733), French Baroque composer, keyboardist
 François Henricus Anthonie van Dixhoorn (born 1948), Dutch poet
François Dominique (disambiguation), several people
 François "Faf" du Plessis (born 1984), South African cricketer
François Duval (disambiguation), several people
 François Duvalier, President of Haiti
 François Englert (born 1932), Belgian particle physicist who in 2013 shared the Nobel Prize with Peter Higgs
 François Feldman (born 1958), French singer
 François Fillon (born 1954), Prime Minister of France 2007–2012
François Fournier (disambiguation), several people
 François Gautier (born 1950), French journalist
 François Hollande (born 1954), President of France 2012–2017
 François Lalande (1930–2020), French actor
 François Lapointe (politician), Canadian politician
 François Lapointe (racewalker) (born 1961), Canadian racewalker
 François Laroque, French academic, translator and Shakespeare specialist
 François Lavoie (born 1993), Canadian ten-pin bowler
 François Leterrier (1929–2020), French film director and actor
 François Lionet, French computer programmer
 François Mitterrand, President of France 1981–1995
 François Pienaar, South African rugby player
 François Pinault (born 1936), French billionaire
 François-Henri Pinault (born 1962), French billionaire
 François Quesnay, French economist
 François Rabbath, French double-bass player and composer
 François Rabelais, French Renaissance writer, doctor and humanist
 François-Xavier Roth, French conductor
 François Rozenthal, French ice hockey player
 François Ruffin, French journalist, filmmaker, author and politician
 François Sagat, French model and porn actor
 François Steyn, South African rugby player
 François Vincent Henri Antoine de Stuers, Dutch general
 François Tracanelli, French pole vaulter
 François Trinh-Duc, French rugby player
 François Truffaut, French film director, screenwriter, producer, actor and film critic
 Francois Turbot, a recurring character in the Canadian television series PAW Patrol
 François Vérove (1962–2021), French serial killer
 François Vidal (1832–1911), French poet

People with the surname 
 Abraham Francois, Canadian soccer player
 Alexandre François, French linguist
 André François, Hungarian-born French cartoonist
 Christian Francois, volleyball player from Trinidad and Tobago
 Claude François, French pop singer
 Déborah François, Belgian actress
 Deondre Francois, Haitian-born American football player
 Elvis Francois (born c. 1985), American orthopedic surgeon and singer
 Guillaume François, Belgian professional footballer
 Hermann von François (1856–1933), German general during WW1
 Hunter J. Francois, Saint Lucian politician
 Jacques François, French actor
 Jacques Francois (footballer), Haitian football player
 Julien François, French footballer
 Kendall Francois, serial killer from Poughkeepsie, New York
 Mark François, British politician
 Tony François, Mauritian international footballer

See also
 "Citizen François", a caricatural personification of Revolutionary France by James Gillray
 François, Deux-Sèvres, a municipality in the Poitou-Charentes region, France
 Francois, Newfoundland and Labrador, a settlement in Canada
 Le François, a town on the island of Martinique, France
 Lefrançois, a French surname
 Saint-François (disambiguation)
 , a common name describing the French language before the reform of French orthography in 1835.

Given names
Surnames
French masculine given names
French-language surnames
Surnames of French origin
Toponymic surnames
Surnames of Haitian origin